Pyromaia cuspidata, also known as the dartnose pear crab, is a species of crab in the family Inachoididae. This crab appears similar to Anasimus latus. It is a long-legged crab with a trident-shaped rostrum, and occurs in Atlantic waters from North Carolina to west Florida, and in the Gulf of Mexico through the Yucatán Peninsula down to Nicaragua. It is also found in Cuban waters.

References

Majoidea
Crustaceans of the Atlantic Ocean
Crustaceans described in 1871